Costulopsis albocincta is a species of minute sea snails, marine gastropod molluscs in the family Cerithiopsidae.

It was described by Melvill and Standen in 1896.

Distribution
This marine species occurs off the Loyalty Islands.

References

 Cecalupo A. & Robba E. (2019). Costulopsis nom. nov., a replacement name for the Gastropoda genus Nanopsis Cecalupo & Robba, 2010 (Mollusca: Gastropoda: Cerithiopsidae), preoccupied by Nanopsis Henningsmoen, 1954 (Arthropoda: Ostracoda: Beyrichiidae). Bollettino Malacologico. 55(1): 65-67.

External links
 Melvill, J. C. & Standen, R. (1896). Notes on a collection of shells from Lifu and Uvea, Loyalty Islands, formed by the Rev. James and Mrs. Hadfield, with list of species. Part II. Journal of Conchology. 8: 273-315 

Gastropods described in 1896
Cerithiopsidae